The Bald Truth is a weekly online streamed radio show hosted by Spencer Kobren, founder and president of the American Hair Loss Association. The show previously aired two hours long and aired every Sunday night at 5PM PT/8PM ET from the Westwood One studios in Los Angeles, California.  Host Kobren is also an author, having published the books The Bald Truth: The First Complete Guide to Preventing and Treating Hair Loss, and The Truth About Women's Hair Loss.

The show itself has been on the air for more than sixteen years and originally started as a half-hour show (less than 20 minutes minus commercials) on Saturday nights on New York City's 77 WABC, and has since broadcast on other heritage stations such as 710 WOR in New York City and KLSX in Los Angeles.

The current show is available via video Podcast on the Bald Truth website along with the GFQ Network every Tuesday Night from 8 PM to 10 PM and is produced by the Andrew Zarian of the GFQ Network.  

Unlike many radio talk shows that focus on a specific subject or human ailment, The Bald Truth does not try to sell any particular products on the air. The subject matter of the show does not always stick to hair loss, as much is talked about regarding men's lifestyle and sex life.

Spencer Kobren also produced a show for ex-affiliate WJFK-FM titled Highway Justice.

External links 

American radio programs
Radio programs on XM Satellite Radio